Jon A. Knokey is an American politician. He served as a Republican member of the Montana House of Representatives, where he represented District 65, including parts of Bozeman, Montana.  Knokey is a candidate for Lieutenant Governor of Montana, running on a ticket with Montana Attorney General Tim Fox.

References

1981 births
Living people
Republican Party members of the Montana House of Representatives
People from Bozeman, Montana
Montana State University alumni
Tuck School of Business alumni
Harvard Kennedy School alumni
Montana State Bobcats football players